trans-1,2-Diaminocyclohexane is an organic compound with the formula C6H10(NH2)2. This diamine is a building block for C2-symmetric ligands that are useful in asymmetric catalysis.

A mixture of all three stereoisomers of 1,2-diaminocyclohexane is produced by the hydrogenation of o-phenylenediamine. It is also side product in hydrogenation of adiponitrile.  The racemic trans isomer (1:1 mixture of (1R,2R)-1,2-diaminocyclohexane and (1S,2S)-1,2-diaminocyclohexane) can be separated into the two enantiomers using enantiomerically pure tartaric acid as the resolving agent.

Derived ligands
Representative ligands prepared from (1R,2R)- or (1S,2S)-1,2-diaminocyclohexane are diaminocyclohexanetetraacetic acid (CyDTAH4), Trost ligand, and the salen analogue used in the Jacobsen epoxidation.

References

Diamines
Chelating agents